Isacio Calleja García (6 December 1936 – 4 February 2019) was a Spanish professional footballer who played as a defender.

Club career
Calleja was born in Valle de Cerrato, Province of Palencia. Save for a very brief loan spell with CD Guadalajara in the third division he spent his entire 14-year professional career with Atlético Madrid, making his La Liga debut on 4 January 1959 in a 0–1 away loss against Real Oviedo and finishing his first season with only nine games (albeit all complete).

From there onwards, Calleja became an important defensive member for the Colchoneros, helping the team to back-to-back Copa del Rey trophies from 1959 to 1961, both won against Real Madrid at the Santiago Bernabéu Stadium. In the 1961–62 European Cup Winners' Cup, which also ended in conquest, he contributed nine appearances.

On 19 April 1970, Calleja scored his only goal of the campaign in a 2–0 win at CE Sabadell FC, which granted Atlético the national championship. He retired from football in July 1972 at the end of 1971–72 after winning his fourth Spanish Cup, at the age of 35. During his spell with his main club, he appeared in 425 official matches (76 in the domestic cup and 45 in European competition).

International career
Calleja was a Spanish international for more than one decade. He made his debut on 19 April 1961, in a 2–1 win in Wales for the 1962 FIFA World Cup qualifiers.

Calleja helped the national side win the 1964 European Nations' Cup on home soil, playing four matches the qualifying phase and the finals combined. In total, he earned 13 caps.

Post-retirement and death
After retiring, Calleja, who majored in law, worked as a solicitor. On 4 February 2019, he died at the age of 82 in Madrid.

Honours

Club
Atlético Madrid
La Liga: 1965–66, 1969–70
Copa del Generalísimo: 1959–60, 1960–61, 1964–65, 1971–72
UEFA Cup Winners' Cup: 1961–62

International
Spain
UEFA European Championship: 1964

References

External links
 
 
 
 

1936 births
2019 deaths
Sportspeople from the Province of Palencia
Spanish footballers
Footballers from Castile and León
Association football defenders
La Liga players
Tercera División players
Atlético Madrid footballers
CD Guadalajara (Spain) footballers
Spain B international footballers
Spain international footballers
1964 European Nations' Cup players
UEFA European Championship-winning players